Arema FC Putri (English: Arema FC Women's), is an Indonesia professional Women's football club based in Malang, East Java, Indonesia. Founded in 2019, the club is affiliated with men's professional association football club Arema FC. It currently plays in the Liga 1 Putri, the top women's league in Indonesia.

History
In July 2019, Arema FC announced their commitment to take part in the inaugural season of Liga 1 Putri, a women's football competition in Indonesia and formed a women's football team. Arema Football Club Putri were officially introduced on 2 October 2019 at the Kanjuruhan Stadium during the Arema match against PSM Makassar in the competition Liga 1. Alief Syahrizal was appointed as the club's first head coach, with their inaugural 24-player squad announced on the same day.

The nickname for Arema FC Putri is Ongis Kodew (Lionesses). Ongis is a language from Malang which means singo (lion in Javanese). Since a long time ago the lion was an icon of the city of Malang. While Kodew is the slang of wedok (women in Javanese). There have been several color changes from Arema FC Putri, but the official colors of the Arema Putri club are blues and red.

The team's first game back was on 6 October 2019, where they lost 0–1 against Galanita Persipura in the Liga 1 Putri.

Honours

League
 Liga 1
 Semi-finalist: 2019
Cup
 Women Sriwijaya FC Championship Winner: 2021
 Pertiwi Cup: 
 3rd place: 2022
 East Java Pertiwi Cup:
 Winner: 2022
 DKI Jakarta Governor Cup Winner: 2022
 Regent of Malang Cup Winner': 2022

Players
Current squad

 Head coaches Head Coach by years (2019–present)''

References

External links
 

Putri
Association football clubs established in 2019
Women's football clubs in Indonesia
2019 establishments in Indonesia